Franklin Allan Millar (September 18, 1929 – December 20, 1987) was a Canadian professional ice hockey goaltender who played in six games in the National Hockey League with the Boston Bruins during the 1957–58 season. The rest of his career, which lasted from 1949 to 1970, was spent in various minor leagues. He was involved in the first trade in Philadelphia Flyers history when the Toronto Maple Leafs traded him to Philadelphia for cash on September 12, 1967.

Career statistics

Regular season and playoffs

References

External links

1929 births
1987 deaths
Boston Bruins players
Buffalo Bisons (AHL) players
Canadian expatriate ice hockey players in the United States
Canadian ice hockey goaltenders
Chicoutimi Saguenéens (QSHL) players
Denver Invaders players
Hershey Bears players
Kansas City Royals (USHL) players
Montreal Junior Canadiens players
New Haven Eagles players
Portland Eagles players
Quebec Aces (AHL) players
Quebec Aces (QSHL) players
Rochester Americans players
Seattle Totems (WHL) players
Shawinigan-Falls Cataracts (QSHL) players
Ice hockey people from Winnipeg
Springfield Indians players
Sudbury Wolves (EPHL) players
Tulsa Oilers (1964–1984) players
Vancouver Canucks (WHL) players
Victoria Maple Leafs players
Winnipeg Canadians players